Lisa Lewis is an American poet and professor, born 1956 in Roanoke, Virginia.

Biography 
Lewis is the author of six books of poetry and is the director of the creative writing program at Oklahoma State University. In 2011, she received an Individual Artist's Fellowship from the National Endowment for the Arts. She is the Editor in Chief and Poetry Editor of the literary magazine housed at Oklahoma State University, The Cimarron Review. Her first book, The Unbeliever, was published as winner of the Brittingham Prize in Poetry in 1994. Silent Treatment, winner of the National Poetry Series, appeared from Viking/Penguin in 1998. New Issues Poetry & Prose published Vivisect in 2010, and Burned House with Swimming Pool, appeared as winner of The American Poetry Review Prize in 2011. In 2016, The Body Double appeared from Georgetown Review Press.
The poet Ada Limón calls Lewis’ poems "acutely honest, bristling with beauty, and terribly real." She goes on to say, "calling out from the rural horse pastures and the blackness of the mind's night, The Body Double is, at once, a tribute to the world's roughness and bowing down to its mysterious power." In 2017, Lewis received the Tenth Gate Prize, a prize awarded each year to an exceptional manuscript by a mid-career poet with at least two previous books, from the Word Works.

References 

21st-century American poets
1956 births
Living people
Poets from Virginia
People from Lenoir, North Carolina
Poets from North Carolina
American women poets
Writers from Roanoke, Virginia
21st-century American writers
21st-century American women writers